Albert Alphonse Champoudry (8 May 1880 in Paris – 23 June 1933 in Paris) was an early twentieth century French middle-distance runner. He participated in Athletics at the 1900 Summer Olympics in Paris and won the silver medal in the 5000 metres team race for the French team with Jacques Chastanie, Henri Deloge, Gaston Ragueneau, and André Castanet.

References

External links

1880 births
1933 deaths
French male middle-distance runners
Olympic athletes of France
Olympic silver medalists for France
Olympic silver medalists in athletics (track and field)
Athletes (track and field) at the 1900 Summer Olympics
Medalists at the 1900 Summer Olympics
Athletes from Paris
19th-century French people
20th-century French people